The Squad is a British television teen drama series, broadcast on ITV, that ran for just a single series of twelve episodes from 1 October to 17 December 1980. The series follows the fictional exploits of a group of Metropolitan Police police cadets as they take part in various community related projects whilst learning the ropes to become fully fledged police officers. The series specifically focused on the activities of four cadets: Alan Martin, George Booker, Jogger Cummins and Sandra Henley. Coincidentally, actor Mark Botham, who played the role of cadet Alan Martin, later went on to appear as PC Danny Sparkes in the BBC police procedural TV series Juliet Bravo.

The series aired at 4.30pm on Wednesdays, and featured a team of high quality notable writers, including the likes of John Kershaw, Paula Milne, Roy Russell, Simon Masters, William Humble, Barry Purchese and James Follett. The series also featured early acting credits from the likes of Gary Beadle, Jesse Birdsall, Perry Fenwick, Rik Mayall, Caroline Quentin and Josette Simon. Notably, the series has never been released on VHS or DVD.

Cast
 Max Hafler as George Booker
 Mark Botham as Alan Martin
 Nicholas Cooke as Jogger Cummins
 Yvette Harris as Sandra Henley
 Claire Walker as Elizabeth Maxwell
 Tammi Jacobs as Judy Banks
 Leon Eagles as Sgt. Lewis
 Michael Fox as Michael Stephens
 Jamie Roberts as Robby McLeod
 Sidney Livingstone as Sgt. Miles
 Terence Bayler as Commander Fenton
 Robert Daws as Mike Jenkins
 Stafford Gordon as Jim Allen
 Renny Lister as Eadie Booker
 Jonathan Newth as Insp. Williams
 Jeanne Watts as Insp. Morgan

Episodes

References

External links

1980 British television series debuts
1980 British television series endings
1980s British children's television series
1980s British drama television series
ITV children's television shows
British crime television series
Television series by Fremantle (company)
Television shows produced by Thames Television
English-language television shows
Television shows set in London